Sabanchi (Habansı) is a rural locality (a village) in Shushnursky Selsoviet, Krasnokamsky District, Bashkortostan, Russia. The population was 21 as of 2010. There is 1 street.

Geography 
Sabanchi is located 76 km southeast of Nikolo-Beryozovka (the district's administrative centre) by road. Yanaul is the nearest rural locality.

References 

Rural localities in Krasnokamsky District